Macristis is a genus of litter moths of the family Erebidae. The genus was described by Schaus in 1916.

Species
 Macristis bilinealis Barnes & McDunnough, 1912
 Macristis geminipunctalis Schaus, 1916
 Macristis pharosalis Schaus, 1916
 Macristis schausi Barnes & Benjamin, 1924

References

Herminiinae
Moth genera